The Chamber of Central Mass South is the local chamber of commerce for portions of Hampden and Worcester counties within South Central Massachusetts. The chamber represents the business needs of over 300 businesses and thousands of employees in the area.

Membership in the Chamber of Central Mass South also includes membership in the Worcester Regional Chamber of Commerce at no extra cost.

Mission
The Central Mass South Chamber of Commerce is the leading advocate for business, promotes the success of its members, and enhances regional prosperity through networking, education, and promotion.

Vision
To be the leading business organization in the region, fostering exciting economic and community development with a new spirit for collaboration and success.

Chamber Staff
 Alexandra McNitt, Executive Director
 Jack Starkey, Communications

Executive committee
 Erika Travinski, Chair, Center of Hope  
 Bruce Watkins, Treasurer, Karl Storz Endovision

Board of directors

Member Benefits
The mission at the Central Mass South Chamber is to be a membership driven organization that provides resources and services to promote and maintain a strong business environment. The chamber offers the following programs and services such as networking, promotion, education and skills development, and advocacy.

Issues
The Central Mass South Chamber of Commerce supports the development of regional higher education centers that would allow students to join a manufacturing training program and advance to associate and four-year degree programs. This program would run through the Quinsigamond Community College and focus on optics and micro-electronics manufacturing, a skill set needed in this region of Massachusetts.

Events
 Monthly Fun at Five networking events
 Annual Golf Classic
 Harvest Festival
 Annual Clambake

Example Members

Example Legislative Members

References

External links
 Official Website of the Chamber of Central Mass South
 Official Website for the Town of Sturbridge

Worcester County, Massachusetts

Chambers of commerce in the United States
Sturbridge, Massachusetts